Theron (gen.: Θήρωνος; died 473 BC), son of Aenesidamus, was a Greek tyrant of the town of Acragas in Sicily from 488 BC. According to Polyaenus, he came to power by using public funds allocated for the hire of private contractors meant to assist with a temple building project, to instead hire a personal group of bodyguards. With this force at his disposal, he was able to seize control of the town's government. He soon became an ally of Gelo, who at that time controlled Gela, and from 485 BC, Syracuse.  Gelo later became Theron's son-in-law.

Theron went to war with the city of Selinunte and the tyrant of Himera, Terillus. The latter, expelled from his city, therefore sought an alliance with Carthage through his son-in-law Anaxilas, tyrant of Rhegium.  Theron occupied Himera but was then besieged in this city by a Carthaginian army, assisted by Terillus.  In 480 BC, Theron, with the support of Gelo, won a great victory outside the walls of Himera against the Carthaginians and their allies. During the reign of Theron, Acragas along with Syracuse and Selinunte formed a kind of "triumvirate" which dominated Greek Sicily at the time. Theron died in 473 BC and was briefly succeeded by his son Thrasydaeus, before he was defeated by Gelo's brother and successor, Hiero I.  After that defeat, Acragas came under the control of Syracuse.

Pindar dedicates two Olympian odes, 2 & 3, to Theron, both for the same victory in the chariot race at the Olympic Games of 476 B.C.  The poet Simonides of Ceos was also active at Theron's court.

References

Bibliography

External links
 The death of Minos in Sicily

|width=25% align=center|Preceded by:-
|width=25% align=center|Tyrant of Acragras488 BC – 473 BC
|width=25% align=center|Succeeded by:Thrasydaeus
|-

Sicilian tyrants
Ancient Acragantines
5th-century BC Greek people
473 BC deaths
Ancient Olympic competitors
Ancient Greek chariot racers
Year of birth unknown